Mulheres Ricas (Portuguese for Rich Women) was a Brazilian reality television show that aired on the Band television network. It premiered on 2 January 2012 and ran for two seasons until its cancellation in 2013.

Cast

Episodes

Season 1 (2012)

Season 2 (2013)

* Each point represents 60.000 households in São Paulo. All numbers are provided by IBOPE.

References

External links
 

2012 Brazilian television series debuts
2013 Brazilian television series endings
Brazilian reality television series
Mass media portrayals of the upper class
Portuguese-language television shows
The Real Housewives spin-offs
Rede Bandeirantes original programming
Television shows set in São Paulo